Cities and towns under the oblast's jurisdiction:
Kursk (Курск) (administrative center)
city okrugs:
Seymsky (Сеймский)
Tsentralny (Центральный)
Zheleznodorozhny (Железнодорожный)
Kurchatov (Курчатов)
Lgov (Льгов)
Shchigry (Щигры)
Zheleznogorsk (Железногорск)
Districts:
Belovsky (Беловский)
with 18 selsovets under the district's jurisdiction.
Bolshesoldatsky (Большесолдатский)
with 12 selsovets under the district's jurisdiction.
Cheremisinovsky (Черемисиновский)
Urban-type settlements under the district's jurisdiction:
Cheremisinovo (Черемисиново)
with 12 selsovets under the district's jurisdiction.
Dmitriyevsky (Дмитриевский)
Towns under the district's jurisdiction:
Dmitriyev (Дмитриев)
with 19 selsovets under the district's jurisdiction.
Fatezhsky (Фатежский)
Towns under the district's jurisdiction:
Fatezh (Фатеж)
with 21 selsovets under the district's jurisdiction.
Glushkovsky (Глушковский)
Urban-type settlements under the district's jurisdiction:
Glushkovo (Глушково)
Tyotkino (Тёткино)
with 14 selsovets under the district's jurisdiction.
Gorshechensky (Горшеченский)
Urban-type settlements under the district's jurisdiction:
Gorshechnoye (Горшечное)
with 15 selsovets under the district's jurisdiction.
Kastorensky (Касторенский)
Urban-type settlements under the district's jurisdiction:
Kastornoye (Касторное)
Novokastornoye (Новокасторное)
Olymsky (Олымский)
with 21 selsovets under the district's jurisdiction.
Khomutovsky (Хомутовский)
Urban-type settlements under the district's jurisdiction:
Khomutovka (Хомутовка)
with 20 selsovets under the district's jurisdiction.
Konyshyovsky (Конышёвский)
Urban-type settlements under the district's jurisdiction:
Konyshyovka (Конышёвка)
with 18 selsovets under the district's jurisdiction.
Korenevsky (Кореневский)
Urban-type settlements under the district's jurisdiction:
Korenevo (Коренево)
with 16 selsovets under the district's jurisdiction.
Kurchatovsky (Курчатовский)
Urban-type settlements under the district's jurisdiction:
Imeni Karla Libknekhta (Имени Карла Либкнехта)
Ivanino (Иванино)
with 10 selsovets under the district's jurisdiction.
Kursky (Курский)
with 21 selsovets under the district's jurisdiction.
Lgovsky (Льговский)
with 17 selsovets under the district's jurisdiction.
Manturovsky (Мантуровский)
with 19 selsovets under the district's jurisdiction.
Medvensky (Медвенский)
Urban-type settlements under the district's jurisdiction:
Medvenka (Медвенка)
with 15 selsovets under the district's jurisdiction.
Oboyansky (Обоянский)
Towns under the district's jurisdiction:
Oboyan (Обоянь)
with 19 selsovets under the district's jurisdiction.
Oktyabrsky (Октябрьский)
Urban-type settlements under the district's jurisdiction:
Pryamitsyno (Прямицыно)
with 10 selsovets under the district's jurisdiction.
Ponyrovsky (Поныровский)
Urban-type settlements under the district's jurisdiction:
Ponyri (Поныри)
with 13 selsovets under the district's jurisdiction.
Pristensky (Пристенский)
Urban-type settlements under the district's jurisdiction:
Kirovsky (Кировский)
Pristen (Пристень)
with 18 selsovets under the district's jurisdiction.
Rylsky (Рыльский)
Towns under the district's jurisdiction:
Rylsk (Рыльск)
with 27 selsovets under the district's jurisdiction.
Shchigrovsky (Щигровский)
with 18 selsovets under the district's jurisdiction.
Solntsevsky (Солнцевский)
Urban-type settlements under the district's jurisdiction:
Solntsevo (Солнцево)
with 16 selsovets under the district's jurisdiction.
Sovetsky (Советский)
Urban-type settlements under the district's jurisdiction:
Kshensky (Кшенский)
with 18 selsovets under the district's jurisdiction.
Sudzhansky (Суджанский)
Towns under the district's jurisdiction:
Sudzha (Суджа)
with 21 selsovets under the district's jurisdiction.
Timsky (Тимский)
Urban-type settlements under the district's jurisdiction:
Tim (Тим)
with 13 selsovets under the district's jurisdiction.
Zheleznogorsky (Железногорский)
Urban-type settlements under the district's jurisdiction:
Magnitny (Магнитный)
with 18 selsovets under the district's jurisdiction.
Zolotukhinsky (Золотухинский)
Urban-type settlements under the district's jurisdiction:
Zolotukhino (Золотухино)
with 19 selsovets under the district's jurisdiction.

References

Kursk Oblast
Kursk Oblast